Tom Toms of Mayumba is a 1955 Italian adventure film directed by Gian Gaspare Napolitano.

Cast
 Pedro Armendáriz - Martinez
 Habib Benglia - Gomba
 Jacques Berthier - Clemens Van Waerten
 Kerima - Madalena
 Philippe Lemaire
 Marcello Mastroianni - Alessandrini
 Domenico Meccoli
 Paul Muller - Dr. Assar
 Francine Delore Rhiney - Louise
 Charles Vanel - Carlo Leonardi

References

External links

1955 films
Italian adventure films
1950s Italian-language films
1955 adventure films
Italian black-and-white films
Films directed by Gian Gaspare Napolitano
Films directed by Folco Quilici
Films set in Belgian Congo
Films set in the 1920s
1950s Italian films